Old Pulford Brook Meadows is a Site of Special Scientific Interest in the preserved county of Clwyd, north Wales.

See also
List of Sites of Special Scientific Interest in Clwyd

Sites of Special Scientific Interest in Clwyd
Meadows in Wales